Barrow Haven railway station serves the village of Barrow Haven in North Lincolnshire, England. The station has a single platform on the single-track line, with a shelter and a telephone on the platform. Stopping services from Barton-on-Humber to Cleethorpes call at the station. All services are provided by East Midlands Railway who operate the station.

History
The station was opened as part of the branch line from New Holland to Barton-on-Humber in 1849.

On 8 May 2022, the station closed to allow the single platform to be replaced in a £1.3 million project. It was expected to reopen in October. The station reopened a month later in November.

Services
All services at Barrow Haven are operated by East Midlands Railway using Class 156 DMUs.

There is a Sunday service of four trains per day in each direction during the summer months only. There are no winter Sunday services at the station.

Services were previously operated by Northern Trains but transferred to East Midlands Railway as part of the May 2021 timetable changes.

References

References

Sources

External links

Railway stations in the Borough of North Lincolnshire
DfT Category F2 stations
Former Great Central Railway stations
Railway stations in Great Britain opened in 1849
Railway stations served by East Midlands Railway
Former Northern franchise railway stations